Alispoides is a genus of snout moths. It was described by Ragonot, in 1888, and contains the species Alispoides vermiculella. It is found in southern Africa.

References

Phycitinae
Monotypic moth genera
Moths of Africa